Rakovnik pri Šentrupertu ( or) is a village in the Municipality of Šentrupert in southeastern Slovenia. It lies south of Šentrupert and east of Mirna in the historical region of Lower Carniola. The railway line from Sevnica to Trebnje runs across the settlement's territory. The Municipality of Šentrupert is now included in the Southeast Slovenia Statistical Region.

Name
The name of the settlement was changed from Rakovnik to Rakovnik pri Šentrupertu in 1953. In the past the German name was Kroisenbach.

Notable people
 Count Josef Anton Barbo von Waxenstein (1863–1930), aristocrat and politician

References

External links
Rakovnik pri Šentrupertu at Geopedia

Populated places in the Municipality of Šentrupert